Ramen is a rural locality (a village) in Ilkinskoye Settlement, Melenkovsky District, Vladimir Oblast, Russia. The population was 25 as of 2010.

Geography 
Ramen is located on the Ramenka River, 25 km southwest of Melenki (the district's administrative centre) by road. Dvoynovo is the nearest locality. etimologia

References 

Rural localities in Melenkovsky District